iForIndia.org Foundation is a not-for-profit organization which aims to politically empower citizens through the use of technology. It is a platform where citizens can rate the performance of their elected representatives on I for India's web-platform, based on the quality of public services in their assembly constituency. This data is used to generate real-time report cards for Members of Legislative Assembly (MLAs), Members of Parliament (MPs), Chief Ministers (CMs) and the Prime Minister.

Mission
The goal of this organization is to include more citizens in the democratic process, to inform the voters about their representatives and the quality of public services in their areas. Additionally the foundation aims at bringing data-driven discussions and accountability into politics by tracking the performance of politicians on a real-time basis.

People behind the initiative
iForIndia was founded by Ankur Garg, an IIM Ahmedabad alum  and an ex-Microsoft employee  and Tarun Jain, a University of Southern California grad and an ex-Capital One Financial employee.iForIndia was founded in 2013.

Report Card
The Report Cards display the aggregated ranking on each of the 24 parameters that users rate their representative's performance on. Each Report Card also contains an overall ranking for the elected official. They also include basic information about the elected public officials like his/her educational background, profession, and participation in Parliament. The report cards are available on the website iForIndia.org.

Rating System
The ratings are on a scale of 0 to 5. An average rating of 0-2 is 'Fail,' 2–3.5 is 'Average' and 3.5-5 is 'Pass'. 
People can rate their representatives on very specific issues. The parameters cover the broad categories of basic needs (electricity, water, transport, sanitation, education, healthcare), governance & administration (law & order, govt offices, e-governance, price rise, poverty, disaster management), growth & progress (traffic, roads, higher education, jobs, business friendliness, tourism) and reputation (scams, public comments, women empowerment, backward sections, religious harmony, fulfilling promises) etc. These factors help in calculating metric specific ratings, category ratings (aggregates of metrics within a category) and an overall rating for the official.

User Authentication
A strong focus on security includes a mobile number authentication and fraud check algorithms to ensure the identity of individuals rating their elected officials cannot be compromised and that the system remains defensible against fake users and multiple account holders.

Future Plans
I for India plans on launching the portal in most regional languages, developing a smartphone apps, SMS based rating, call back option, and kiosks.

References

External links
 Official website
 https://www.facebook.com/iforindiaorg
 www.twitter.com/iforindiaorg

Political organisations based in India
2013 establishments in India